Keep the Dream Alive is an album by saxophonist David "Fathead" Newman recorded in 1977 and released on the Prestige label.

Track listing 
 "Keep the Dream Alive" (David "Fathead" Newman) – 5:46
 "Destiny" (David Batteau, Richard Holland) – 5:38
 "Silver Morning" (Kenny Rankin, Yvonne Rankin) – 3:29
 "Freaky Beat" (Newman, William Fischer) - 5:40
 "I Am Singing" (Stevie Wonder) – 6:32
 "Clouds" (Mauricio Einhorn, Durval Ferreira) – 5:59
 "As Good As You Are" (William Fischer) – 6:19

Personnel 
David "Fathead" Newman – tenor saxophone, alto saxophone, soprano saxophone, flute
George Cables, Hilton Ruiz – keyboards
George Davis, Lee Ritenour – guitar
Wilbur Bascomb – electric bass 
Idris Muhammad – drums
Bill Summers – congas, percussion
Jeff Davis, Larry Moses – trumpet (tracks 1, 2, 5 & 7)
Earl McIntyre, Janice Robinson – trombone (tracks 1, 2, 5 & 7)
Kenneth Harris – flute (tracks 1, 2, 5 & 7)
Ed Xiques – baritone saxophone (tracks 1, 2, 5 & 7)
Renée Manning. Yvonne Fletcher – backing vocals (tracks 1, 2, 5 & 7)
William Fischer – arranger, conductor

References 

David "Fathead" Newman albums
1978 albums
Prestige Records albums
Albums produced by Orrin Keepnews
Albums arranged by William S. Fischer
Albums conducted by William S. Fischer